Klaus Jacob may refer to:

Klaus Jacob (rower) (born 1943), German rower
Klaus Jacob (political scientist) (born 1967), German political scientist

See also
Klaus Jacobs, German-born businessman